Damian (also Damien) Pettigrew (March 10, 1963) is a Canadian filmmaker, screenwriter, producer, author, and multimedia artist, best known for his cinematic portraits of Balthus, Federico Fellini, and Jean Giraud.

Released theatrically in fifteen countries, his film Fellini: I'm a Born Liar won the Rockie Award for Best Documentary at the Banff World Television Festival and was nominated for the Prix Arte at the European Film Awards, Europe's equivalent of the Oscars.

Biography
Pettigrew's mother was a child psychologist. His father, Dr. J.F. Pettigrew, was the first Canadian surgeon to diagnose the heart condition known as aortic coarctation in 1953.

After reading English, French and Italian Literature at the universities of Bishop's, Oxford, and Glasgow (where he discovered the work of Scottish film director Bill Douglas), Pettigrew studied cinema at IDHEC in Paris. At the Cinémathèque Française, he met Brion Gysin and Steve Lacy and began frequenting their artists' circle. If his work is influenced by Gysin's celebrated cut-up technique, the profound and lasting effect on his life was his friendship with Samuel Beckett.

In 1983, Pettigrew launched a remake of Film (film) (1965) starring Klaus Kinski, with Beckett as consultant and Raoul Coutard as cameraman. Kinski’s scheduling, however, proved intractable. Beckett next proposed Jack Lemmon for the role but the project was abandoned when Lemmon explained he was incapable of competing with Buster Keaton (who first played the roles of O and E in 1965). With Beckett and Pettigrew in 1984, the actor David Warrilow initiated Take 2, a tentative sequel to Film, but the project remained unfinished at the playwright's death in 1989. In 1990, Pettigrew settled in Paris to devote himself to filmmaking.

In 1999, he co-founded Portrait et Compagnie with French producer Olivier Gal. He spends a short part of each year on Lake Memphremagog in the Eastern Townships of Quebec.

Work
A recognized authority on Federico Fellini, his portrait of the maestro, Fellini: I'm a Born Liar, won the prestigious Rockie Award at the 2002 Banff World Television Festival, receiving excellent reviews in The New Yorker, The New York Times, Los Angeles Times, Newsweek International, Le Monde, Corriere della Sera, l'Unità, The Herald, The Telegraph (London), and newspapers throughout Europe, Brazil, Australia and Japan. Nominated for Best Documentary at the European Film Awards, Europe's equivalent of the Oscars, the film established his reputation as a director of "extraordinarily controlled" feature documentaries. The interview transcripts were published in 2003 as I'm a Born Liar: A Fellini Lexicon with 125 illustrations and a preface by Fellini biographer Tullio Kezich. The Italian director pays particular homage to Tullio Pinelli, his co-scriptwriter on such classics as I Vitelloni, La Strada, and La Dolce Vita.

Other films include portraits of Eugène Ionesco, Italo Calvino, and Jean Giraud.  His Balthus Through the Looking Glass, a study of the controversial French painter, was filmed in Super 16 over a 12-month period in Switzerland, Italy, France and the Moors of England. Esteemed by Guy Davenport, it was honored in a cycle of film classics by Jean Renoir, Marcel Carné, and Jean Vigo at the Museum Ludwig (Cologne, Germany) in September 2007.

In 2010, Pettigrew directed MetaMoebius, a cinematic essay on French graphic designer Moebius aka Jean Giraud for the Fondation Cartier pour l'Art Contemporain and CinéCinéma Classic. His documentary, The Irene Hilda Story, based on the European cabaret tradition during the Second World War as experienced by French stars Irene and Bernard Hilda, Micheline Presle and Henri Salvador, was broadcast in France and Germany by ARTE France that same year.

A mid-career retrospective of his work in film was held at the Centre des Arts d'Enghien-les-Bains from 5 October 2011 to 28 March 2012. His informal discussion with Ingmar Bergman (conducted in the fall of 2003 at Fårö Island) on the Swedish director's affinities with Samuel Beckett's work was published in L’Âge d’or du cinéma européen in 2011.

In 2012, he completed Inside Italo (Lo specchio di Calvino), a feature-length study of Italo Calvino for ARTE France in co-production with Italy’s Ministero per i Beni e le Attività Culturali and the National Film Board of Canada. Starring Italian actor Neri Marcorè and distinguished literary critic Pietro Citati, the docu-fiction uses in-depth conversations filmed at the writer's Rome penthouse a year before his death in 1985 and rare footage from RAI, BBC, and INA (Institut national de l'audiovisuel) television archives. ARTE and SKY ARTE (Italy) broadcast the 52-minute version on 19 December 2012 and 14 October 2013, respectively.

Pettigrew is currently directing the first feature-length documentary on Carolyn Carlson, the France-based American dancer and choreographer. Begun in January 2012 and continuing into 2021, the film focuses on the creation of several major works by Carlson including Synchronicity (2012), Dialogue with Rothko (2013) and Woman in a Room with Diana Vishneva, principal dancer with the Mariinsky Ballet and the American Ballet Theatre, Black Over Red (2017) with Marie-Agnès Gillot, star dancer at the Paris Opéra Ballet, as well as her latest choreography titled The Tree (2021).

In development 
In development are two feature films: Darkness Visible starring Tim Roth and Eriq Ebouaney, and Beckett, based on the director's experience working with Samuel Beckett.

Selected filmography

Writer-Director
 Fellini ou l'amour de la vie (1993)
 Mr Gir et Mike S. Blueberry (1999)
 L'histoire d'Irène / The Irene Hilda Story (2009)
 Fellini : 8½ en six mémos / Fellini's 8½ in 6 Memos (2009)
 Ionesco : Autour du Roi se meurt avec Michel Bouquet (2009)
 MetaMoebius : Giraud-Moebius, métamorphoses (2010)
The Rome Trilogy:
Balthus Through the Looking Glass / Balthus de l'autre côté du miroir (1996)
Fellini: I'm a Born Liar / Fellini, sono un gran bugiardo / Fellini, je suis un grand menteur (2002)
Inside Italo / Lo specchio di Calvino / Dans la peau d'Italo Calvino (2012)
 Carolyn Carlson, Dare to Risk (2022)
 Fellini Politicus (2021)

Producer
Ionesco : Conversations autour d'une caméra (Ionesco interviews)
Fellini: I'm a Born Liar (Fellini interviews)
Inside Italo (Calvino interviews)
Allain Leprest
Jean-Jacques Annaud (Annaud interviews)
 Carolyn Carlson

Screenplays
Les Yeux de ma mâitresse (2005 - funded by Centre National de la Cinématographie)
Inside Italo (2012 - funded by Centre National de la Cinématographie and Ministero per i Beni e le Attività Culturali)
Darkness Visible (2018)
The World is a Wildflower (2019)
Sam and Suzanne (2020)

Video art
40RO (2003)
4 Faces 5 Voices (2018)
Marlène (2021)

Selected publications
This bibliography is focused on the published interviews that were filmed, produced and directed by Pettigrew in collaboration with the following artists:

 Fellini, Federico & Pettigrew, Damian:
 Fellini, je suis un grand menteur. Paris: L'Arche, 1994.
 Fellini, eu sou um grande mentiroso. Rio de Janeiro: Nova Fronteira, 1995.
 Fellini, Ich bin ein großer Lügner. Munich: Verlag der Autoren, 1995.
 'Fellini: Creation and the Artist' in Projections 4. London: Faber and Faber, 1995.
 'Fellini et l'entretien avec Damian Pettigrew' in Cahiers Jungiens de Psychanalyse. (Paris, Issue 104, 2002.)
 Fellini, sono un gran bugiardo. Prefazione di Tullio Kezich. Roma: Elleu, 2003.
 I'm a Born Liar: A Fellini Lexicon. Preface by Tullio Kezich. New York, Harry N. Abrams, Inc., 2003.
 Federico Fellini. Sou um grande mentiroso. Uma conversa com Damian Pettigrew. Lisboa: Fim de Século, 2008.
 Calvino, Italo & Pettigrew, Damien:
 The Paris Review Interviews - The Art of Fiction, No. 130. (Issue 124, Fall 1992).
 "Sogno e delirio. Il Calvino segreto" in La Repubblica, 10 September 1995.
 Uno scrittore pomeridiano. Intervista sull'arte della narrativa a cura di William Weaver e Damien Pettigrew con un ricordo di Pietro Citati. Roma: Minimum fax, 2003.

Essays on cinema 

 « Ascenseur (les objets felliniens) » in Fellinicittà (ed. J-M. Méjean). Paris: Editions de la Transparence, 2009.
 « Trois films, trois sourires : quelques regards sur Bergman » in L’Age d’or du cinéma Européen 1950-1970 (ed. Denitza Bantcheva). Chatou: Editions du Revif, 2011.().

Interviews online 

 « Les dernières interrogations de Pierre Emmanuel » in Le Monde (7 October 1984) Interview with Pierre Emmanuel
 « Le Méxique et le serpent à plumes »  Interview with Jean-Claude Carrière
 "The World Outside the Self" in CV/11, IV, 2 (Spring 1979), 26-30 Interview with Ralph Gustafson

Awards and festivals
Information for this section provided by IMDb and the official site of Fellini: I’m a Born Liar.

'UNESCO Grand Prize - Best Documentary1997 for Balthus Through the Looking GlassBest Photography Prize - Lausanne International Festival of Art Films1997 for Balthus Through the Looking GlassOfficial Selection - 8th Marseille International Film Festival (Vue sur les docs)1997 for Balthus Through the Looking GlassOfficial Selection - 56th Edinburgh International Film Festival2002 for Fellini: I'm a Born Liar (selected in over 40 international festivals including Edinburgh, Moscou, Amsterdam, Toronto and Montréal)Nomination Prix Arte for Best Documentary - European Film Awards2002 for Fellini: I’m a Born LiarCoup de Cœur Award - 13th Marseille International Film Festival (Vue sur les docs)2002 for Fellini: I’m a Born LiarRockie Award for Best Arts Documentary - Banff World Television Festival2002 for Fellini: I’m a Born LiarHomage to Fellini 1993-2003 - Cannes International Film Festival, Cinémathèque Française and Rimini Fellini Foundation2003 for Fellini: I’m a Born LiarOfficial Selection - 1st Cairo Panorama of European Film2004 for Fellini: I’m a Born Liar Official Selection - Toronto Jewish Film Festival (selected in 10 international festivals)
2010 for The Irene Hilda StoryOfficial Selection - 14th Blue Metropolis2012 for Inside ItaloItalo Calvino - 90th Anniversary 1923-2013 - Centro Sperimentale di Cinematografia'2013 for Inside ItaloMember, The Society of Multimedia Authors of France (SCAM), The Society of Authors of France (SGDL), and ONE Campaign

See also
Art film
Video art
Eastern Townships

Notes and references

External links

Newsweek International Michael J. Agovino: "Directing the Director"
PopMatters Jonathan Kiefer: "Tales Out of School"
The New Yorker David Denby: "Monstres sacrés"
The New York Times A.O. Scott: "Putting Fellini in Front of the Lens"
St Louis Post-Dispatch Harper Barnes: "A Work of Art"
RAIlibro.It Stas' Gawronski : "Il testamento artistico di Federico Fellini" 
dsonline.it  Mario Verdone: "Un eccezionale documento biografico" 
Indiewire Interviewed by Wendy Mitchell
Radio National Australia Interviewed by Julie Rigg
Radio France Entretien avec Caroline Caldier 
The Paris Review Italo Calvino interviewed by Damien Pettigrew
Film Comment - Review of I'm a Born Liar: A Fellini Lexicon''

Film directors from Quebec
Canadian documentary film directors
Canadian screenwriters in French
Living people
Year of birth missing (living people)